Spy Records was Italian record label, specializing in Italo dance and Eurodance, and owned by TIME Group. It was founded by Giacomo Maiolini in 1999. Spy label rose as departament of Time Records, after the death of Italian Style Production.

History
After founding the record label, Maiolini handed Spy Records to Rossano Prini at the midst of 1999. After that, Prini began to select established artists to musical repertoire and contracted the Tristano and Erika De Bonis brothers and DJs, in order to work in his recording.

In 2004, Prini left Spy Records to work in Label 73 and, in 2005, the record label closed.

Spy Records artists
Dave Leatherman
DJ Ross
E. Magic
Erika
Magic Box

External links
Spy Records on Discogs

Italian record labels
Record labels established in 1999
Record labels disestablished in 2005